The 2007 Meijer Indy 300 was a race in the 2007 IRL IndyCar Series, held at Kentucky Speedway. It was held over 9 -August 11, 2007, as the fourteenth round of the seventeen-race calendar. It was the fourth and final night race of the season. After the checkered flag, Dario Franchitti crashed and flipped his car flipped for the second race in succession, as he mistakenly thought there was another lap left of the race, and went over the back of Kosuke Matsuura's car.

Classification

References 
IndyCar Series

Meijer Indy 300
Meijer Indy 300
Meijer Indy 300
Kentucky Indy 300